Neomordellistena crassipennis is a beetle in the genus Neomordellistena of the family Mordellidae. It was described in the year 1967 by Franciscolo.

References

crassipennis
Beetles described in 1967